Aprutino Pescarese PDO is a Protected Designation of Origin (PDO) olive oil, produced in the Province of Pescara, in the  Abruzzo  Regione. It is among the first group of Italian extra virgin olive oils to gain the PDO.

Cultivar 
Dritta
Leccino
Toccolana

Organoleptic traits 
Aprutino Pescarese PDO has the following traits:
 Color: green to yellow;
 Odor: middle-high fruity;
 Taste: fruity;
 Oleic acid max. acidity not exceeding 0,6 grams per 100 grams of oil;
 Panel Test score:  ≥ 6.5;
 Number of peroxides: ≤ 14 Meq O2/Kg;
 K270: ≤ 1.50;
 Oleic Acid: 68.00% and 85.00%;
 Polyphenols: ≥ 100 p.p.m.

See also 
 Italian products with protected designation of origin
 Olive oil regulation and adulteration
 Olive oil
 Protected Geographical Status

References

External links 
Official Journal of the European Union (GUCE L 163/96 del 02.07.1996), Reg. CE n° 1263/96
 Technical production regulation, in Italian
 Consortium site Aprutino Pescarese D.O.P.

Italian products with protected designation of origin
Olive oil